Wiang Subdistrict, Fang is a tambon (subdistrict) of Fang District, in Chiang Mai Province, Thailand. In 2005 it had a population of 26,810 people. The tambon contains 19 villages.

References

See also 
 Fang (town), includes five villages of Wiang

Tambon of Chiang Mai province
Populated places in Chiang Mai province